Harish Chandra Singh Rawat (3 July 1934 – 20 January 2008) was a mountaineer who climbed  the Mt. Everest in 1965. He was one of the 9 summiters of the first successful Indian Everest Expeditions that climbed Mount Everest in May 1965 led by  Captain M S Kohli. He is the seventh Indian man and twenty second man in world that climbed Mount Everest. On May 24, 1965  Vohra and Ang Kami Sherpa together reached the top of Mount Everest
On May 29, 12 years to the day from the first ascent of Mount Everest the fourth and last summit team with Major H. P. S. Ahluwalia and Phu Dorjee Sherpa, Rawat reached on the summit. This was the first time three climbers stood on the summit together.

Biography
Rawat participated in a number of expeditions including Nanda Devi, Sunanda Devi, Kanglacha, Hathi Parbat, Tirsuli, Rathong, Nanda Khat and Nun Kun.
In 1962, he led a party, including Sonam Wangyal, another Everester of the 1965 expedition, to Kanglacha, 30 miles south of Leh. In 1963, Rawat climbed Hathi Parbat and a year later he was part of the Tirsuli and Sunanda Devi expedition. In the pre-Everest preparations, he climbed Rathong.

Rawat also participated in a joint ascent by the Indian intelligence and the U.S. Central Intelligence Agency to the Nanda Devi peak to test the Chinese missile program development. He died of a lung cancer in New Delhi, aged 74. He was vice president of the Indian Mountaineering Foundation.

Rawat had graduated from Lucknow University in 1952 and joined central government service in the same year, in Intelligence Bureau. He was posted as Deputy Central Intelligence Officer, Gorakhpur, in October 1963. Thereafter he shifted to Special Service Bureau (now Sashastra Seema Bal). He was Joint Assistant Director in SSB headquarters in 1965. In January 1970, he became the founder chief of the High Altitude Operations Training Centre, at Sandev, near Didihat. In October 1972, it was merged with SSB's Frontier Academy at Gwaldam as its Mountaineering Wing, and Rawat became that wing's first Senior Instructor.

Honors and awards 
He was awarded Arjuna award    and Padma Shri  for his achievements.

References

See also
Indian summiters of Mount Everest - Year wise
List of Mount Everest summiters by number of times to the summit
List of Mount Everest records of India
List of Mount Everest records

Indian summiters of Mount Everest
Indian mountain climbers
Recipients of the Padma Shri in sports
Recipients of the Arjuna Award
Mountain climbers from Uttarakhand
1934 births
2008 deaths